The 2010 Southern Conference baseball tournament was held at Joseph P. Riley Jr. Park in Charleston, South Carolina, from May 26 through 30. Top seeded The Citadel won the tournament and earned the Southern Conference's automatic bid to the 2010 NCAA Division I baseball tournament. It was The Citadel's eighth SoCon tournament win.

The tournament used a double-elimination format. Only the top eight teams participate, so Wofford, UNC Greensboro, and Davidson were not in the field.

Seeding

Brackets

Bracket one

Bracket two

Final

Game Summaries

Round One

Round Two

Round Three

Round Four

Final

All-Tournament Team

References 

SoCon Tournament
Southern Conference Baseball Tournament
SoCon baseball tournament
Southern Conference baseball tournament